Dongsong is a town in the west of Henan province, China. It is under the administration of Luoning County in the prefecture-level city of Luoyang. Dongsong was made a people's commune in 1958. It became a township in 1984. In 2011, Dongsong became a town.

Administrative divisions
Villages:
Dongsong, Xi, Zhangzhuang, Qijiagou, Niuzhuang, Yaogou, Zhou, Jiayao, Dasong, Xiaosong, Fangli, Xiwu, Liuyu, Ma, Guo, Niefen, Baiyuan, Yangshuwa, Wangzhuang, Guandong, Guanxi, Guannan, Dingzhai, Luowa, Shanzhuang, Xiahedi, Zhaiyan, Zhonghedi, Beijiuxian, Shangsongyao, Wangling, Xiasongyao, Shanghedi, Zhaoce, Hegou, Miaoxia, Nanjiuxian

References

Township-level divisions of Henan
Luoning County